The Brotherhood of Mutants, also known as the Brotherhood of Evil Mutants and the Brotherhood, is a team of comic book mutant supervillains in Marvel Comics' universe who are devoted to mutant superiority over normal humans. Their roster has varied and has included many powerful and dangerous mutants, and they have often been at odds with the X-Men, although on rare occasions they have worked alongside them, usually in order to overcome some greater evil. The original Brotherhood first appeared in The Uncanny X-Men #4 (March 1964), and were created by Stan Lee and Jack Kirby.

Known members

Other versions

House of M Brotherhood
Since the rise of Mutants in this alternate version of Earth, most human officers were phased out (similar to what happened to S.H.I.E.L.D.), with the exception of Sam Wilson. A mutant strikeforce known as the Brotherhood is also implemented to take down organized crime. Among its members are:

 John Proudstar (leader)
 Avalanche (Dominikos Ioannis Petrakis)
 Blob (Frederick J. Dukes)
 Boom Boom (Tabitha Smith)
 Feral (Lucia Callasantos)
 Frank Castle - only human member; defected to the Avengers.
 Taskmaster - posed as a mutant; was made quadriplegic by Luke Cage after he killed Tigra.

Age of Apocalypse Brotherhood lineup
The Brotherhood of Mutants is referred to as the "Brotherhood of Chaos." Among its members are:

 Arclight (who is not the same as the mainstream Marvel character Arclight/Philippa Sontag)
 Box (Madison Jeffries)
 Copycat (Vanessa Carlyle)
 Spyne
 Yeti

Ultimate Brotherhood lineup
Among the members of the Ultimate Marvel Universe's version of the Brotherhood of Mutants are:

 Blob (Franklin Dukes)
 Detonator
 Forge
 Hard-Drive
 Juggernaut (Cain)
 Longshot (Arthur Centino)
 Magneto (Erik Lehnsherr)
 Mastermind
 Multiple Man (Jamie Madrox)
 Mystique
 Quicksilver (Pietro Maximoff Lensherr) - Defected to the Ultimates. Returned to the Brotherhood.
 Sabretooth (Creed)
 Unus the Untouchable
 Vanisher

Former members
 Cyclops (Scott Summers) - Defected from the X-Men. Returned to the X-Men. Currently deceased.
 Rogue (Marian) - Defected to the X-Men
 Scarlet Witch (Wanda Maximoff Lensherr) - Defected to the Ultimates.
 Toad - Defected to the X-Men. Currently deceased.
 Wolverine (James "Logan" Howlett) - Placed as a mole in the X-Men, but defected to the X-Men. Currently deceased.

Animal Evolutionaries
 Prosimian - A mutant ape.
 Orb-Weaver - A mutant spider.
 Sumatran - A mutant rhinoceros.
 Saluki - A mutant dog.
 Kathleen - A mutant caterpillar.

References

Lists of Marvel Comics characters by organization